Lieutenant General Robert B. Flowers was born in Pennsylvania and resided in several areas of the world as his family moved during his father's military career. Following graduation and commissioning from the Virginia Military Institute in 1969, he completed Airborne and Ranger training and began his career as an Engineer Officer. He holds a master's degree in civil engineering from the University of Virginia and is a Registered Professional Engineer. Prior to his selection as Chief of Engineers and Commanding General of the U.S. Army Corps of Engineers, he served as the Commanding General of the Engineer School and Fort Leonard Wood, Missouri. On April 16, 2018 the Best Sapper Competition was named in honor of LTG Flowers for his contributions to the Sapper Leader Course and his efforts in getting the Sapper Tab approved by General Peter Schoomaker on  June 28, 2004.

His other commands include an Engineer Company in Germany;
307th Engineer Battalion, 82nd Airborne Division;
20th Engineer Brigade, XVIII Airborne Corps;
Mississippi Valley Division of the U.S. Army Corps of Engineers.

Operational deployments include 
command of an expanded brigade of 10 battalions (7,700 soldiers) during Operation Desert Shield and Operation Desert Storm;
Task Force Engineer for the Joint Task Force in Somalia;
Deputy Chief of Staff for Engineering (Forward), U.S. Army Europe in Bosnia.

Other assignments include 
Assistant Division Commander, 2nd Infantry Division (Mechanized), Eighth U.S. Army, South Korea
Deputy Commanding General and Assistant Commandant, U.S. Army Engineer Center and School, Fort Leonard Wood, Missouri
Branch Chief, Counter-narcotics Operations Division, Washington, D.C.
Combat Developer, Combined Arms Center, Fort Leavenworth, Kansas
Field Engineer and Research Project Manager for the Portland Engineer District;
Staff Engineer in Thailand for the Udon Detachment and Northern Thailand.

After retiring from the Army, he joined Dawson & Associates in Washington, DC as a federal permitting advisor.

References
This article contains public domain text from

External links

Military personnel from Pennsylvania
United States Army generals
Recipients of the Distinguished Service Medal (US Army)
Recipients of the Legion of Merit
Recipients of the Meritorious Service Medal (United States)
Virginia Military Institute alumni
United States Army Corps of Engineers Chiefs of Engineers
University of Virginia School of Engineering and Applied Science alumni
Engineers from Pennsylvania